Lysbeth: A Tale of the Dutch is a 1901 novel by H. Rider Haggard. Lysbeth is a historical novel set in the Netherlands during the time of William the Silent.

Reception
The Spectator magazine, reviewing Lysbeth, said "Mr. Haggard handles all this romantic material with his accustomed vigor and dexterity." The review also said "Lovers of historical romance will enjoy Lysbeth, and readers not very familiar with those wonderful pages in the history of the Netherlands will welcome so pleasant an opportunity as Mr. Haggard affords for rubbing up their rusty knowledge."

References

External links
Complete book at Project Gutenberg
 
Images and bibliographic information for various editions of Lysbeth at SouthAfricaBooks.com

Novels by H. Rider Haggard
1901 British novels
Novels set in the 16th century
English historical novels